Bumble is an online dating application. Profiles of potential matches are displayed to users, who can "swipe left" to reject a candidate or "swipe right" to indicate interest. In heterosexual matches, only female users can make the first contact with matched male users, while in same-sex matches either person can send a message first. The app is a product of Bumble Inc.

Bumble was founded by Whitney Wolfe Herd shortly after she left Tinder. Wolfe Herd has described Bumble as a "feminist dating app". As of January 2021, with a monthly user base of 42 million, Bumble is the second-most popular dating app in the U.S. after Tinder. According to a June 2016 survey, 46.2% of its users are female. According to Forbes, by 2017 the company was valued at more than $1 billion, and the company reported having over 55 million users in 150 countries as of 2019.

History 

Whitney Wolfe Herd, an early VP of Marketing of Tinder, founded Bumble shortly after leaving Tinder. Wolfe Herd sued Tinder for sexual discrimination and harassment and settled for just over $1 million in September 2014. Amidst the media attention surrounding the lawsuit, acquaintance and Badoo founder and CEO Andrey Andreev contacted Wolfe Herd via email, and the two met up. Andreev suggested she get back into the dating space, and the pair eventually formed a partnership in which Andreev would receive 79% ownership in the company following an initial investment of $10 million along with additional investments and Wolfe Herd would serve as founder, CEO and 20% owner. As part of the agreement, the new company would also utilize Badoo's infrastructure and Andreev's consulting. After the partnership was established, the pair recruited fellow Tinder departees Chris Gulczynski and Sarah Mick to design the interface and help launch Bumble. Bumble was launched three months later in December 2014.

The company headquarters are in Austin, Texas and as of 2021 had 650 employees globally. In March 2016, Bumble released BFF mode as a way for users to find platonic friends. After switching into the mode, the app replaces potential dates with people of the user's same sex who are also looking for friends. In June 2016, Bumble announced a partnership with Spotify that would allow users to connect a Spotify account to their profile to show their music interests. In March 2017, the company announced its plan to launch a career networking app, Bumble Bizz. In August 2017, Bumble partnered with the Anti-Defamation League in an effort to remove users who display hate symbols in their profiles. In October 2017, the company launched Bumble Bizz which also uses a woman-first interface.

The company was valued at more than $1 billion in November 2017. When private equity firm The Blackstone Group purchased a majority stake in Bumble's parent company MagicLab, Bumble and its sister apps were valued at $3 billion. Bumble and its sister apps earned $162 million in net revenue for 2018. In April 2019, Bumble launched its own lifestyle magazine called Bumble Mag. In 2020, MagicLab was renamed Bumble as the parent company of both Bumble and Badoo. As of 2020, Bumble has over 100 million users worldwide.

In February 2021, Bumble raised $2.2 billion through its IPO and the company had a valuation of over $7 billion. Bumble was listed on the Nasdaq exchange, with shares initially valued at $43 but increasing to $76 on its opening day, valuing the company at more than $13 billion.

In February 2022, Bumble announced it had acquired Fruitz - a French-owned freemium dating app popular with Gen Z and used across Europe. This was the company's first acquisition. Starting from April 2022, Bumble users who report abuse are eligible for a collection of free courses from Bloom, an online provider of support for assault survivors.

Operation 
Formerly, Bumble users were required to log in via Facebook when signing up. In April 2018, Bumble added an option to sign up using only a phone number, following Facebook's involvement in a controversy with Cambridge Analytica. For users who sign up with Facebook, information from their account is used to build a profile with photos and basic information, including the user's college and job.

Users swipe right to "like" a potential match and left to reject them. In matches between a man and a woman, the woman must initiate the conversation with their matches or the matches disappear within 24 hours; either person in a same-sex match can reach out. In 2018, The Daily Dot criticized Bumble for lacking options for users to identify as genderqueer or transgender, in contrast to competitors OkCupid and Tinder. The app later introduced a wider range of gender identity options.

Bumble released a "backtrack" feature in 2015 that allows users to undo accidental left swipes by shaking their phones. Three free "backtracks" are provided initially, which are replenished every three hours. Users have the option to immediately receive a new set of three backtracks by sharing Bumble on Facebook, Instagram, or Twitter, although they are limited to one of these refills per day. The app has features allowing the user to favorite conversations, sort conversations and send photo messages. A "snooze" feature was added in September 2018, to allow users to pause activity and avoid using the app for a period of time.

BFF mode uses the same swipe right or left platform as the app's dating mode and requires that a conversation is started within 24 hours of matching with a potential friend. Conversations started with potential friends are color-coded as green as opposed to yellow for dates. As the feature was rolled out, Bumble also announced that it would eventually release a dual-profile feature allowing users to curate a profile for dating or friendship. In April 2016, the Bumble app was updated to combat ghosting. As part of the update, if a user is messaged after matching with a potential partner and does not respond within 24 hours, the match disappears. Before the update, men were allowed unlimited time to respond to a message from women. An update was also launched for same-sex matches, with either party allowed to initiate and the other having to respond within 24 hours.

Bumble launched a photo verification tool in September 2016 to ensure that users of the app were the same people in their profile pictures. To be verified, users are asked to submit a selfie of them performing a specific pose; the picture is reviewed by a real person who ensures the user is the person in the profile pictures. Bumble was the first dating app to include photo verification in the US.

In June 2019, Bumble announced that it would be enabling in-app voice and video calls on all of its platforms, including Bumble, Bumble Bizz and Bumble BFF. Users must match first before initiating a call.

Bumble's vice president of strategy reported "an 84 percent increase in video calls that were placed between users" during the coronavirus pandemic.

In 2020, Bumble announced that the users can now expand their distance filters to match with anyone in the country. Previously, the app only allowed people to connect within a  range. Daters can add a "virtual dating" badge to their profile to indicate that they are willing to date over video calls.

Paid subscriptions 
In August 2016, Bumble announced the release of its paid service, Bumble Boost, which includes three premium features. These features included Beeline, a list of users who have liked the user; Rematch, which keeps expired matches in a user's queue for 24 additional hours; and Busy Bee, which allows users unlimited 24-hour extensions for matches.

A further premium feature is the ability to purchase "Coins" which allow "SuperSwipes", whereby a user can like another user and the recipient of the like will be notified of the interest. One coin allows one SuperSwipe.

Users 
Bumble had a reported 40 million users as of February 2021, and 27 million downloads as of February 2018. As of September 2019, Bumble was the second most popular dating app in the U.S., with a monthly user base of 5 million.

An April 2016 report by SurveyMonkey stated that 49% of users went on the app daily, and 46.2% of users were female. Wolfe Herd has stated that within the app's first eight months it saw 5 million unique conversations initiated, all by women. In April 2018, Bumble reported that 85% of users were "looking for marriage or a boyfriend/girlfriend", while 4% of men and under 1% of women were "looking for a hookup". They also reported that 25% of users had gone on a first date with someone they found on the app within the previous month.

Bumble has also reported that its users spend an average of 62 minutes on the app daily. In October 2016, the app launched new photo moderation rules that banned mirror selfies, obscured faces, and photos of users in underwear among others. According to The New York Times, as of March 2017, Bumble had more than 800 million matches and 10 billion swipes per month and is the second most popular Lifestyle app in the iOS App Store.

Amid the coronavirus pandemic, Bumble reported a 10.9% increase in monthly active users in the final quarter of 2020.

As part of their IPO filing Bumble announced in January 2021 that they had 2.4 million paying users.

Reception

Feminist label 
Bumble has been considered as a "feminist Tinder". Its founder has confirmed this identity, calling the app "100 percent feminist," although she has attempted to distance the app from Tinder in interviews. Wolfe Herd shared in an interview with Vanity Fair the concept behind the app: "If you look at where we are in the current heteronormative rules surrounding dating, the unwritten rule puts the woman a peg under the man—the man feels the pressure to go first in a conversation, and the woman feels pressure to sit on her hands... If we can take some of the pressure off the man and put some of that encouragement in the woman's lap, I think we are taking a step in the right direction, especially in terms of really being true to feminism. I think we are the first feminist, or first attempt at a feminist dating app."

In June 2016, Bumble posted an open letter to its blog and blocked a user for sexist behavior after he had an outburst at a female user who asked him what he did for a living.

Reviews 
Bumble has had mixed reviews. Reviewers have commented that "the time limit [for communications to be initiated by the woman] is really off-putting", and that "Bumble's incessant push notifications are worded just dramatically enough as to be anxiety inducing."

Concerns 
Bumble has also been criticized for not offering to refund purchases, even those made by mistake. Bumble was sued for not offering refunds of purchases, despite offering a cancel button. The lawsuit is Schlossberg v. Bumble Trading Inc, et al., case No. 1:18-cv-08376, in the US District Court for the Southern District of New York.

In 2020, Bumble agreed to pay $22.5 million in a settlement over plaintiffs' claims that the company's auto-renewal processes were unfair. The class action lawsuit, filed in California, said Bumble charged consumers without their consent. Bumble admitted no wrongdoing in the case.

On January 15, 2021, Bumble temporarily suspended the option to filter matches by political preference in order to "prevent misuse". The move came after several women allegedly used Bumble to gather information from people who had stormed the United States Capitol, then forwarded that information to the FBI. Bumble was criticized by many of its users for being perceived to "protect terrorists" by suspending the filter. Bumble announced that it would be reinstating the option to filter by political preferences later that day.

See also 

 Comparison of online dating services

References

External links 
 

Computer-related introductions in 2014
Internet properties established in 2014
Geosocial networking
Mobile social software
Online dating services of the United States
Online dating applications
2019 mergers and acquisitions
Feminism in the United States
2021 initial public offerings
Companies listed on the Nasdaq
Companies based in Austin, Texas